J. Smalley (dates of birth and death unknown) was an English cricketer. Smalley's batting style is unknown.

Smalley two first-class appearances for Lancashire in 1869, against Surrey at Old Trafford and Sussex at the Royal Brunswick Ground, Hove. He scored 24 runs in his two matches, with a high score of 17.

References

External links
J. Smalley at ESPNcricinfo
J. Smalley at CricketArchive

English cricketers
Lancashire cricketers